The following list is a discography of production by Emile Haynie, an American record producer from Buffalo, New York. It includes a list of songs produced, co-produced and remixed by year, artist, album and title.

Singles produced

2001

A.G. & Party Arty
00. "R.U.G.D. (Emile Remix)"

C-Rayz Walz & Plain Pat - The Prelude
09. "Gear Abby"

2002

Cormega - The True Meaning
01. "Introspective"

Wastelandz
King of Luck (featuring Kwasi Modough & R.A.P.)

2003

Obie Trice - Cheers
05. "Don't Come Down" (co-produced with Eminem)  
14. "Hoodrats" (co-produced with Eminem)

Raekwon - The Lex Diamond Story
10. "Robbery" (featuring Ice Water Inc.)

2004

Ghostface - The Pretty Toney Album
01. "Intro"
Leftover
00. "Struggle"

Cormega - Legal Hustle
03. "Let It Go" (featuring M.O.P.)
11. "Deep Blue Seas" (featuring Jayo Felony & Kurupt)
14. "Redemption" (featuring AZ)

Theodore Unit - 718
11. "Daily Routine" (performed by Shawn Wiggs) 
15. "It's the Unit" (performed by  Shawn Wiggs, Cappadonna, Ghostface Killah)

The Roots - The Tipping Point
Leftover
00. "Pity the Child"

2005

Massive Töne - Zurück in die Zukunft
01. "Bumerang"
02. "Easy" (featuring Fetsum)
06. "Mein Job"
09. "Wellness"
10. "Zurück In Die Zukunkt" (featuring Fetsum)

Proof - Searching for Jerry Garcia
02. "Clap wit Me"
20. "Kurt Kobain"

AZ - A.W.O.L.
03. "New York" (featuring Raekwon & Ghostface Killah)

C-Rayz Walz - Year of the Beast
11. "Say Werd"

2006

Obie Trice - Second Round's on Me
04. "Wanna Know"

Remy Ma - There's Something About Remy: Based on a True Story
16. "Crazy"

Ice Cube - Laugh Now, Cry Later
07. "Doin' What It 'Pose 2Do"

Rhymefest - Blue Collar
05. "All I Do" (produced with Cochise)
14. "Bullet" (featuring Citizen Cope) (produced with Cochise)

2007

WC - Guilty by Affiliation
06. "Dodgeball" (featuring Snoop Dogg & Butch Cassidy)
13. "Gang Injunctions"

Ian Brown - The World Is Yours
01. "The World Is Yours"
04. "Save Us"
05. "Eternal Flame"
07. "Street Children"

NYGz - Welcome 2 G-Dom
03. "3 Man Weave" (featuring Hustle, Mic Ock & Reef)
05. "Sufferin'" (featuring Lil Fame & Rave Roulette)
09. "What Kinda Life" (featuring Raw)

2008

AZ - Undeniable
05. "What Would You Do" (featuring Jay Rush)

Ice Cube - Raw Footage
03. "It Takes a Nation"
12. "Get Money, Spend Money, No Money"
17. "Believe It or Not" (iTunes bonus track)

Kid Cudi - A Kid Named Cudi
03. "Is There Any Love" (featuring Wale)
10. "50 Ways to Make A Record"

2009

Michael Jackson - The Remix Suite
10. "Maria (You Were the Only One)" (Show Me the Way to Go Home Remix)

Royce da 5'9" - Street Hop
01. "Gun Harmonizing" (featuring Crooked I)  
06. "Far Away" 
15. "On the Run"

Slaughterhouse - Slaughterhouse
09. "Onslaught 2" (featuring Fatman Scoop)
15. "Killaz"

Kid Cudi - Man on the Moon: The End of Day
01. "In My Dreams (Cudder Anthem)"  
02. "Soundtrack 2 My Life"
04. "Solo Dolo (Nightmare)"  
11. "CuDi Zone"  
Leftover
00. "Bigger Than You"

2010

Young Sid - What Doesn't Kill Me...
04. "What Don't Kill Me"
06. "Around the World In A Day"
08. "Stuck in a Box" (with Stan Walker)
09. "The Heist"
10. "Taken Away" (featuring Tyree)

Stan Walker - From the Inside Out
13. "Stuck in a Box" (with Young Sid)

Meth * Ghost * Rae - Wu-Massacre
08. "Pimpin' Chipp"

Pill - 1140: The Overdose
13. "Westsiders" (featuring Killer Mike)

Eminem - Recovery
06. "Going Through Changes"

Tinie Tempah - Disc-Overy
10. "Obsession"
13. "Let Go" (co-produced with Naughty Boy)

Kid Cudi - Man on the Moon II: The Legend of Mr. Rager
01. "Scott Mescudi vs. the World" (featuring Cee Lo Green) (co-produced with The Smeezingtons & No I.D.) 
03. "Don't Play This Song" (featuring Mary J. Blige)
04. "We Aite (Wake Your Mind Up)" (co-produced with Plain Pat) 
06. "Mojo So Dope" 
09. "Wild'n Cuz I'm Young" (co-produced with Plain Pat)  
10. "The Mood" (co-produced with No I.D.) 
12. "Mr. Rager" (co-produced with No I.D. & Jeff Bhasker) 
13. "These Worries" (featuring Mary J. Blige) 
15. "All Along"
16. "GHOST!" (co-produced with No I.D. & Ken Lewis)

Kanye West - My Beautiful Dark Twisted Fantasy
09. "Runaway" (featuring Pusha T) (co-produced with Kanye West, Jeff Bhasker & Mike Dean)

2011

STS - The Illustrious
09. "This Is for You"

Paradime - Breaking Beauregard 
 09. "Lovely Day"

Lil Wayne - Tha Carter IV
19. "Novacane" (featuring Kevin Rudolf) (Bonus Track)

Gym Class Heroes - The Papercut Chronicles II
03. "Life Goes On" (featuring Oh Land)

2012

Lana Del Rey - Born to Die
01. "Born to Die" 
02. "Off to the Races" 
03. "Blue Jeans"
05. "Diet Mountain Dew" 
06. "National Anthem" 
07. "Dark Paradise"  
08. "Radio"
09. "Carmen" 
10. "Million Dollar Man" 
11. "Summertime Sadness"
12. "This Is What Makes Us Girls" 
13. "Without You" (Bonus Track)
14. "Lolita" (Bonus Track)
15. "Lucky Ones" (Bonus Track)

Pink - The Truth About Love
01. "Are We All We Are"

Emeli Sandé - Our Version of Events
02. "My Kind of Love" (co-produced with Daniel "Danny Keyz" Tannenbaum and Craze & Hoax)

fun. - Some Nights
08. "All Alright" 
09. "One Foot" 
11. "Out on the Town" (Bonus Track)

Bruno Mars - Unorthodox Jukebox
01. "Young Girls"
02. "Locked Out of Heaven" 
04. "Gorilla"
05. "Moonshine"
11. "Old & Crazy" (featuring Esperanza Spalding) (Bonus Track)

Lana Del Rey - Paradise
02. "American" 
05. "Blue Velvet" 
06. "Gods & Monsters"
07. "Yayo" 
09. "Burning Desire"

The Rolling Stones - GRRR!
Disc two
19. "Doom and Gloom" (co-produced)

2013

ASAP Rocky - Long. Live. ASAP
16. "I Come Apart" (featuring Florence Welch) (co-produced with Amanda Ghost) (Deluxe Edition Track)

OneRepublic - Native
07. "Can't Stop" (co-produced with Jeff Bhasker, Tyler Sam Johnson and Ryan Tedder)

The Neighbourhood - I Love You.
01. "How"		 
02. "Afraid" 
03. "Everybody's Watching Me (Uh Oh)"
05. "Let It Go"
06. "Alleyways" 
07. "W.D.Y.W.F.M?"  
08. "Flawless"
09. "Female Robbery" 
10. "Staying Up" 
11. "Float"

Various artists - Music from Baz Luhrmann's Film The Great Gatsby
07. "Over the Love" (performed by Florence and the Machine)

Dyme-A-Duzin - A Portrait of Donnovan
06. "Wake Up Free"

Travis Scott - Owl Pharaoh
02. "Bad Mood/Shit on You" (co-produced with J Gramm Beats and Travis Scott)

Natalia Kills - Trouble
02. "Problem" (co-produced with Jeff Bhasker and Guillaume Doubet)
03. "Stop Me" 
04. "Boys Don't Cry" (co-produced with Jeff Bhasker)
10. "Watching You"  
13. "Trouble" (co-produced with Jeff Bhasker and Guillaume Doubet)

Sampha
00. "Too Much" (later reworked and produced by Nineteen85 and Sampha for Drake's Nothing Was the Same)

Drake - Nothing Was the Same
12. "Too Much" (featuring Sampha) (reworked and produced by Nineteen85 and Sampha, "Too Much" original producer, writer, engineer)

Eminem - The Marshall Mathers LP 2
06. "Legacy"
15. "Headlights" (featuring Nate Ruess) (produced with Jeff Bhasker)
20. "Beautiful Pain" (featuring Sia) (co-produced with Eminem)

Lana Del Rey - Tropico
02. "Gods & Monsters"

2014

SZA - Z
06. "Green Mile"
09. "Shattered Ring"
10. "Omega"

Ed Sheeran - x
06. "Photograph"

London Grammar - If You Wait
14. "Strong (US Radio Edit)"

Linkin Park - The Hunting Party
11. "Final Masquerade"

FKA twigs - LP1
03. "Two Weeks" (additional production by FKA twigs)
04. "Hours" (additional production with Arca. Produced by Clams Casino)
06. "Video Girl" (additional production by FKA twigs)
09. "Give Up" (additional production by Arca)

Various artists - Shady XV
06. "Guts Over Fear"

2015

ASAP Rocky - At. Long. Last. ASAP
17. "Everyday" (featuring Rod Stewart, Miguel and Mark Ronson) (produced with Mark Ronson and Frans Mernick)

Mark Ronson - Uptown Special
01. "Uptown's First Finale" (credited as additional producer, produced by Mark Ronson and Jeff Bhasker)
02. "Summer Breaking" (credited as additional producer, produced by Mark Ronson and Jeff Bhasker)
07. "Crack in the Pearl" (credited as additional producer, produced by Mark Ronson and Jeff Bhasker)
10. "Heavy and Rolling" (credited as additional producer, produced by Mark Ronson and Jeff Bhasker)

Laura Welsh - Soft Control
03. "Break the Fall"
05. "God Keeps"

Various artists - Home (Original Motion Picture Soundtrack)
03. "Cannonball" (performed by Kiesza)

Emile Haynie - We Fall
01. "Falling Apart" (featuring Andrew Wyatt & Brian Wilson)
02. "Little Ballerina" (featuring Rufus Wainwright)
03. "Wait For Life" (featuring Lana Del Rey)
04. "Dirty World"
05. "A Kiss Goodbye" (featuring Charlotte Gainsbourg, Sampha & Devonte Hynes)
06. "Fool Me Too" (featuring Nate Ruess)
07. "Nobody Believes You" (featuring Andrew Wyatt & Colin Blunstone)
08. "Come Find Me" (featuring Lykke Li & Romy Madley Croft)
09. "Who to Blame" (featuring Randy Newman)
10. "Ballerina's Reprise" (featuring Father John Misty & Julia Holter)
11. "The Other Side"

Various artists - Fifty Shades of Grey: Original Motion Picture Soundtrack
02. "Undiscovered" (performed by Laura Welsh)

Nate Ruess - Grand Romantic
02. "AhHa" (produced with Jeff Bhasker)
03. "Nothing Without Love" (produced with Jeff Bhasker)
04. "Take It Back"  (produced with Jeff Bhasker)
06. "What This World Is Coming To" (featuring Beck) (produced with Jeff Bhasker)
08. "Moment" (produced with Jeff Bhasker)
12. "Brightside" (produced with Jeff Bhasker)

Troye Sivan - Blue Neighbourhood
04. "Talk Me Down" (produced with Bram Inscore)

2016

Peter Bjorn and John - Breakin' Point 
05. "Breakin' Point"

Florence and the Machine - Songs from Final Fantasy XV 
01. "Too Much Is Never Enough"
03. "I Will Be"

Lady Gaga - Joanne 
09. "Come to Mama"

Bruno Mars - 24K Magic 
06. "Straight Up & Down"  
07. "Calling All My Lovelies"

2017

Dua Lipa - Dua Lipa 
07. "New Love" (produced with Andrew Wyatt)

Eminem - Revival 
04. "Untouchable" (produced with Eminem, Mark Batson and Mr. Porter)
05. "River"

Lana Del Rey - Lust for Life 
 "Love"

Sam Smith - The Thrill of It All 
 "Baby, You Make Me Crazy"

2018

Lykke Li - So Sad So Sexy 
 07: "So Sad So Sexy"

Florence + The Machine - High as Hope 
 01: "June" 
 02: "Hunger" 
 03: "South London Forever" 
 04: "Big God" 
 05: "Sky Full of Song" 
 06: "Grace" 
 07: "Patricia" 
 08: "100 Years" 
 09: "The End of Love" 
 10: "No Choir"

Camila Cabello - Camila 
06: "Consequences"

2019

Post Malone - Hollywood's Bleeding
 15. "Myself"

2020

Alicia Keys - Alicia
02. "Time Machine"

Kid Cudi - Man on the Moon III: The Chosen
01. "Beautiful Trip" 
12. "Sept. 16"

Miley Cyrus - Plastic Hearts 

 12. "Golden G String" (produced by Andrew Wyatt)

2021

Cosha - Mt. Pleasant 

 08. "Bad Luck" (produced with Cosha & Mura Masa)

2022

Liam Gallagher - C'MON YOU KNOW 

 01. "More Power" (produced by Andrew Wyatt)
 02. "Diamond in the Dark" (produced by Andrew Wyatt)

References
General

Specific

Discographies of American artists
Production discographies